Kelane is a small village in Khed, in Ratnagiri district, Maharashtra State in India.

References

Villages in Ratnagiri district